Justin Blumfield (born 24 November 1977) is a former Australian rules football player of the Essendon and the Richmond Football Clubs in the Australian Football League (AFL).

His AFL career began in 1996 when he debuted for the Essendon Bombers. He was one of Essendon's consistent players in the years 1999, 2000, 2001 and 2002. Blumfield was a member of the Essendon 2000 premiership team, which defeated Melbourne in the 2000 AFL Grand Final and won a record 24 out of 25 games for the season.

At the end of 2002, he was traded to the Richmond Tigers to help Essendon meet the total player payments limit. He played 19 games over two seasons before he was delisted by them at the end of season 2004. Blumfield returned to be a playing assistant coach for Essendon's affiliated club in the Victorian Football League, the Bendigo Bombers. He was made a life member of Essendon on 15 December 2010.

After retiring from football he moved to Newcastle, New South Wales, to study for a Master of Business and Administration degree. In 2010, he joined the Cardiff Hawks in the Black Diamond Australian Football League. He is the nephew of former  player Max Blumfield. Blumfield has since gone on to be the DFO general manager.

Playing statistics

|- style="background-color: #EAEAEA"
! scope="row" style="text-align:center" | 1996
|style="text-align:center;"|
| 34 || 10 || 3 || 4 || 66 || 51 || 117 || 34 || 18 || 0.3 || 0.4 || 6.6 || 5.1 || 11.7 || 3.4 || 1.8
|-
! scope="row" style="text-align:center" | 1997
|style="text-align:center;"|
| 32 || 15 || 5 || 6 || 104 || 86 || 190 || 54 || 15 || 0.3 || 0.4 || 6.9 || 5.7 || 12.7 || 3.6 || 1.0
|- style="background:#eaeaea;"
! scope="row" style="text-align:center" | 1998
|style="text-align:center;"|
| 32 || 21 || 12 || 9 || 197 || 162 || 359 || 108 || 32 || 0.6 || 0.4 || 9.4 || 7.7 || 17.1 || 5.1 || 1.5
|-
! scope="row" style="text-align:center" | 1999
|style="text-align:center;"|
| 32 || 24 || 20 || 15 || 221 || 171 || 392 || 90 || 32 || 0.8 || 0.6 || 9.2 || 7.1 || 16.3 || 3.8 || 1.3
|- style="background:#eaeaea;"
! scope="row" style="text-align:center;" | 2000
|style="text-align:center;"|
| 32 || 24 || 27 || 20 || 228 || 205 || 433 || 121 || 49 || 1.1 || 0.8 || 9.5 || 8.5 || 18.0 || 5.0 || 2.0
|-
! scope="row" style="text-align:center" | 2001
|style="text-align:center;"|
| 32 || 13 || 8 || 5 || 94 || 71 || 165 || 52 || 27 || 0.6 || 0.4 || 7.2 || 5.5 || 12.7 || 4.0 || 2.1
|- style="background:#eaeaea;"
! scope="row" style="text-align:center" | 2002
|style="text-align:center;"|
| 32 || 22 || 11 || 9 || 214 || 147 || 361 || 108 || 62 || 0.5 || 0.4 || 9.7 || 6.7 || 16.4 || 4.9 || 2.8
|-
! scope="row" style="text-align:center" | 2003
|style="text-align:center;"|
| 13 || 11 || 3 || 0 || 57 || 49 || 106 || 29 || 13 || 0.3 || 0.0 || 5.2 || 4.5 || 9.6 || 2.6 || 1.2
|- style="background:#eaeaea;"
! scope="row" style="text-align:center" | 2004
|style="text-align:center;"|
| 13 || 8 || 2 || 1 || 30 || 38 || 68 || 20 || 6 || 0.3 || 0.1 || 3.8 || 4.8 || 8.5 || 2.5 || 0.8
|- class="sortbottom"
! colspan=3| Career
! 148
! 91
! 69
! 1211
! 980
! 2191
! 616
! 254
! 0.6
! 0.5
! 8.2
! 6.6
! 14.8
! 4.2
! 1.7
|}

References

External links

Australian rules footballers from the Australian Capital Territory
Living people
Essendon Football Club players
Essendon Football Club Premiership players
Richmond Football Club players
1977 births
Allies State of Origin players
Tuggeranong Football Club players
Australia international rules football team players
One-time VFL/AFL Premiership players